The 1953 Scottish Cup Final was played on 25 April 1953 at Hampden Park in Glasgow and was the final of the 68th staging of the Scottish Cup. Aberdeen and Rangers contested the match. The match was drawn 1–1 and was replayed four days later. In the rematch Rangers won 1–0  through a Billy Simpson goal in the 42nd minute.

The victory was Rangers' 14th Scottish Cup win.

Final

Teams

Replay

Teams

References

External links
SFA report first match
SFA report replay
 Video highlights (first game) from official Pathé News archive
 Video highlights (replay) from official Pathé News archive

1953
Scottish Cup Final
Scottish Cup Final 1953
Scottish Cup Final 1953
1950s in Glasgow